The Child's Right to Nurse Act is a proposed legislative act which seeks to protect a child's right to be breastfed in any location where the mother-child pair are otherwise authorized to be.  It was first introduced in the West Virginia House of Delegates by Bonnie Brown (D-30th-Kanawha).  Delegates Long, Palumbo, Butcher, Ellem, Varner and Doyle co-sponsored the bill. Dr. Foster and several co-sponsors introduced the bill in the Senate on the same day. The title of the bill highlights that this is the first attempt to introduce breastfeeding legislation that focuses on the child rather than the mother.

Supporters of the bill, which passed 93-4 in the House but went without vote in the Senate, hoped that West Virginia would join other states in protecting breastfeeding mothers from discrimination. Breastfeeding in public is not itself illegal.

On Friday, July 29, 2005, Governor Joe Manchin stated that mothers shouldn't be harassed for breastfeeding. He made this statement during an event in the Governor's Reception Room where he issued a proclamation declaring the month of August as Breastfeeding Month in West Virginia.

The group striving for passage of the bill includes Republicans, Democrats, and Independents. Jennifer Bryant, a mother harassed in Charleston, is a Democrat while Cassie Martin, a mother asked to stop breastfeeding in Huntington, is a Republican.

Legislation protecting breastfeeding mothers was finally passed in 2014.

Bill text
§16-1-19. Child's right to nurse: Location where permitted; right protected.

(a) Breast feeding is an important, basic act of nurturing that is protected in the interests of maternal and child health. A mother may breast feed a child in any location, public or private, where the mother and child are otherwise authorized to be.

Reason for the legislation
Both residents of and visitors to West Virginia had been harassed for breastfeeding their children in civic centers, pools, and restaurants.  Example: Jennifer Bryant was told by a security guard that she needed to move to the restroom during a car show in Charleston to feed her 6 month old in early 2004. 

West Virginia presently ranks 49th for the incidence and duration of breastfeeding in the U.S., with mothers citing a lack of support, even active discouragement, as a primary reason for stopping.

Supporters of the bill
Numerous organizations endorsed the bill:
American Academy of Pediatrics - WV
American Association of University Women - WV Chapter
American Civil Liberties Union of WV
American College of Nurse Midwives - WV Chapter
Coalition for West Virginia Children
FamilyCare
Kanawha Lactation Association
La Leche League of Jefferson County
La Leche League of West Virginia/Virginia
La Leche League, Charleston Chapter
Midwives' Alliance of WV
National Association of Social Workers - WV Chapter
Prevent Child Abuse West Virginia
Right From the Start, Regions 1, 4, 5 & 7
TEAM for West Virginia Children
West Virginia Association of School Nurses
WV Citizens Action Group
West Virginia Community Voices, Inc.
WV FREE
WV Healthy Kids and Families Coalition
West Virginia Hospital Association
WV Interfaith Center for Public Policy
West Virginia State Medical Association
YWCA of Charleston

Opposition to the bill

House of Delegates
Four members of the House of Delegates, three men and one woman voted against the bill. All were Republicans.
Delegate Patti Schoen (R-14th-Putnam) stated, "I just don’t think there’s a need for the law."
Delegate Chris Wakim (R-3rd-Ohio) claimed that women in his constituency considered protecting breastfeeding rights "a waste of paper."

Senate
In contrast to the House, the greatest opposition to the bill came from the Senate's top Democrats.
Senator Prezioso (D-13th-Marion), Chairman of the Health and Human Resources Committee, held up the legislation until the last hearing of the general session. During that last hearing, Mr. Prezioso introduced amendments that would have limited the protections. The first would have restricted the protections to children under twelve months. This amendment was voted down. The second amendment to this bill would have limited the places where the law applied. This amendment passed.
The bill cleared the Health and Human Resources Committee and should have been reported on the floor that legislative day following the committee vote. However, Mr. Prezioso chose not to report until only two legislative days remained. Thus, the bill died on the final day of the session as it had not been read on three consecutive days as required by the West Virginia Constitution.

See also
Breastfeeding in public

External links
West Virginia Legislature

West Virginia law
Proposed laws of the United States
Breastfeeding in the United States